Ceyzériat is a commune in the Ain department, Auvergne-Rhône-Alpes region in eastern France. Ceyzériat station has rail connections to Bourg-en-Bresse and Oyonnax.

History 
Hippolyte Paul Jayr, twice minister during the July monarchy, was mayor of the commune at the end of the 19th century. The French archaeologist and assyriologist Maurice Pézard (1876–1923) died in this commune.

Geography

Climate
Ceyzériat has a oceanic climate (Köppen climate classification Cfb).

Politics and administration

Population

See also
Communes of the Ain department

References

External links

Ceyzériat official website

Communes of Ain
Ain communes articles needing translation from French Wikipedia